Burney Mountain is a lava dome complex located in the Cascade Range of eastern Shasta County, California, next to the slightly larger Crater Peak and slightly smaller Magee Peak. It stands at 2,397 m (7,854 ft) and is around 8.9 km (5.5 mi) south-southeast of Burney, California.

Burney Mountain last erupted about 230,000 years ago during the Pleistocene epoch. It is composed of two craters, which open to the east.

The eastern side of the mountain was burned in the Eiler Fire in 2014, ultimately destroying 21 structures and injuring 11 people, mostly in Hat Creek.

References 

Mountains of Northern California
Volcanoes of California
North American 2000 m summits
Pleistocene lava domes